Margy Pargy is a studio album released by jazz pianist Dave Burrell. It was released on March 9, 2005, by Splasc Records. It is a solo album and, in contrast, a week later the album After Love was released, which featured collaborations with such jazz greats as Roscoe Mitchell, Don Moye (both from the Art Ensemble of Chicago) and Ron Miller. The Penguin Guide to Jazz described it as "A quality solo set [...] The best things are standards, including a long, troublous 'Lush Life'."

Track listing 
"I Only Have Eyes for You" (Warren) — 6:28
"Expansion" (Burrell) — 8:00
"DB Blues" (Burrell) — 5:49
"Prelude to Crucifado" (Burrell) — 2:27
"Crucifado" (Burrell) — 4:58
"Margy Pargy" (Burrell) — 6:52
"Lush Life" (Strayhorn) — 9:00
"My Foolish Heart" (Young) — 4:15
"So in Love" (Porter) — 3:43

Personnel 
Dave Burrell – piano
Pete Kercher, Giacomo Pellicciotti – liner notes
Luigi Naro – graphic design
Luciano Rossetti – photography, cover photo
Peppo Spagnoli – producer
Giuseppe Emmanuele – engineer

Reception 
Allaboutjazz.com reviewer Rex Butters comments that Burrell "reaches effortlessly through time to retrieve all flavors of the blues" to create an album that is "boasting reverent roots as well as forward vision."

References 

2005 albums
Dave Burrell albums
Solo piano jazz albums